Kgomodiatshaba is a village in Kgatleng District of Botswana. The village is located around 110 km north of Mochudi, and it has a primary school. The population was 330 in 2001 census.

References

Kgatleng District
Villages in Botswana